Eight Songs for a Mad King is a monodrama by Sir Peter Maxwell Davies with a libretto by Randolph Stow, based on words of George III.  The work was written for the South-African actor Roy Hart and the composer's ensemble, the Pierrot Players. It was premiered on 22 April 1969.

Lasting half an hour, it is scored for a baritone with an extraordinary command of extended techniques covering more than five octaves, and six players (Pierrot ensemble + percussion):

flute (doubling piccolo)
clarinet
percussion (1 player): railway whistle, snare drum, 2 suspended cymbals, foot cymbal, 2 wood blocks, 2 bass drums, chains, ratchet, tom-toms, tamtam, tambourine, rototoms, toy bird-calls, 2 temple blocks, wind chimes, crotales, sleigh bells, dulcimer, glockenspiel, steel bars, crow, didgeridoo, washboard
piano (doubling harpsichord)
violin
cello

Extended techniques are also required by the instrumentalists: for example there is frequent use of flutter-tonguing and multiphonics for the wind instruments and the pianist is required to play inside the piano with a plectrum. In the third song all the instrumentalists except the flautist play bird-calls and mechanical bird noises. Although most of the techniques are notated quite specifically, there are passages of guided improvisation, most obviously in the wind instruments at the end of the 5th song, when they are instructed to "use given pitches as centres around which groups — small, slow phrases, are built."

Like its predecessor, Pierrot lunaire, different movements make use of different combinations from the ensemble. The full ensemble is used in the first, third, fifth, and seventh songs as well as the first transition. The second song omits the wind instruments; the fourth song omits the wind instruments, violin, and piano; the sixth song omits the flute (with the exception of the first, very short, chord); the second transition omits the baritone; the eighth song omits the violinist (as the instrument has been smashed by this point).

The piece moves through a variety of different rhythmic characters. Some passages, such as the second transition, are strictly pulsed with a relatively clear metre (although extensive use of cross-rhythm), others use overlapping tempi (e.g. in the first and fifth songs), and there is also extensive use of recitative, most obviously in the cello-baritone duet of the fourth song.

The piece is generally written in a modernist idiom, although it makes frequent use of pastiche, allusion, and direct quotation. The songs derive from tunes played by an extant mechanical organ owned by George III, tunes that he attempted to train bullfinches to sing:

 The Sentry (King Prussia's Minuet)
 The Country Walk (La Promenade)
 The Lady-In-Waiting (Miss Musgrave's Fancy) Transition
 To Be Sung on the Water (The Waterman)
 The Phantom Queen (He's Ay A-Kissing Me) Transition
 The Counterfeit (Le Conterfaite)
 Country Dance (Scotch Bonnett)
 The Review (A Spanish March)

The action unfolds as a soliloquy by the king, the players being placed on stage (traditionally) in large birdcages, and climaxes in his snatching and smashing the violin.

The score is published by Boosey & Hawkes, and its cover shows a famous excerpt from the score, the third movement, in which the staves are arranged like the bars of a birdcage.

Besides Hart, exponents of this work have included William Pearson, Michael Rippon, Thomas Meglioranza, Julius Eastman and Vincent Ranallo.  The Swedish baritone Olle Persson performed the work in Stockholm in the 1990s. The British baritone Richard Suart has performed the piece in Gelsenkirchen‚ Milan‚ Helsinki‚ Strasbourg‚ Stavanger and Paris; in 1987 The Musical Times described Suart's take as "compelling from start to finish". Welsh baritone Kelvin Thomas sang the role at Munich's Kammerspiele Schauspielhaus in 2011, in a 2012 performance with Psappha, available to watch online, and in a production by Music Theatre Wales in 2013.

References

External links
 Review of a recording
 Roy Hart homepage
 . A complete performance in 2012 by Kelvin Thomas and the Psappha Ensemble, supervised by Sir Peter Maxwell Davies, uploaded by the Psappha Ensemble.

Operas
Operas by Peter Maxwell Davies
English-language operas
One-act operas
Monodrama
1969 operas
Song cycles by Peter Maxwell Davies
Classical song cycles in English
Randolph Stow
Cultural depictions of George III